In mathematics, specifically representation theory, tilting theory describes a way to relate the module categories of two algebras using so-called tilting modules and associated tilting functors. Here, the second algebra is the endomorphism algebra of a tilting module over the first algebra.

Definitions
Suppose that A is a finite-dimensional unital associative algebra over some field. A finitely-generated right A-module T is called a tilting module if it has the following three properties:
T has projective dimension at most 1, in other words it is a quotient of a projective module by a projective submodule.
Ext(T,T ) = 0.
The right A-module A is the kernel of a surjective morphism between finite direct sums of direct summands of T.

Given such a tilting module, we define the endomorphism algebra B = EndA(T ). This is another finite-dimensional algebra, and T is a finitely-generated left B-module. 
The tilting functors HomA(T,−), Ext(T,−), −⊗BT and Tor(−,T) relate the category mod-A of finitely-generated right A-modules to the category mod-B of finitely-generated right B-modules.

In practice one often considers hereditary finite-dimensional algebras A because the module categories over such algebras are fairly well understood. The endomorphism algebra of a tilting module over a hereditary finite-dimensional algebra is called a tilted algebra.

Facts
Suppose A is a finite-dimensional algebra, T is a tilting module over A, and B = EndA(T ). Write F = HomA(T,−), F′ = Ext(T,−), G = −⊗BT, and G′ = Tor(−,T). F is right adjoint to G and F′ is right adjoint to G′.

If A has finite global dimension, then B also has finite global dimension, and the difference of F and F induces an isometry between the Grothendieck groups K0(A) and K0(B).

In case A is hereditary (i.e.

 and  showed that in general A and B are derived equivalent (i.e. the derived categories Db(A-mod) and Db(B-mod) are equivalent as triangulated categories).

Generalizations and extensions
A generalized tilting module over the finite-dimensional algebra A is a right A-module T with the following three properties:
T has finite projective dimension.
Ext(T,T) = 0 for all i > 0.
There is an exact sequence  where the Ti are finite direct sums of direct summands of T.
These generalized tilting modules also yield derived equivalences between A and B, where B = EndA(T ).

 extended the results on derived equivalence by proving that two finite-dimensional algebras R and S are derived equivalent if and only if S is the endomorphism algebra of a "tilting complex" over R. Tilting complexes are generalizations of generalized tilting modules. A version of this theorem is valid for arbitrary rings R and S.

 defined tilting objects in hereditary abelian categories in which all Hom- and Ext-spaces are finite-dimensional over some algebraically closed field k. The endomorphism algebras of these tilting objects are the quasi-tilted algebras, a generalization of tilted algebras. The quasi-tilted algebras over k are precisely the finite-dimensional algebras over k of global dimension ≤ 2 such that every indecomposable module either has projective dimension ≤ 1 or injective dimension ≤ 1.  classified the hereditary abelian categories that can appear in the above construction.

 defined tilting objects T in an arbitrary abelian category C; their definition requires that C contain the direct sums of arbitrary (possibly infinite) numbers of copies of T, so this is not a direct generalization of the finite-dimensional situation considered above. Given such a tilting object with endomorphism ring R, they establish tilting functors that provide equivalences between a torsion pair in C and a torsion pair in R-Mod, the category of all R-modules.

From the theory of cluster algebras came the definition of cluster category (from ) and cluster tilted algebra''' associated to a hereditary algebra A. A cluster tilted algebra arises from a tilted algebra as a certain semidirect product, and the cluster category of A summarizes all the module categories of cluster tilted algebras arising from A''.

References

Representation theory